Emmanuel Kipchirchir Mutai (born 12 October 1984) is a long distance runner from Kenya, who specialises in marathons. He is now the joint 6th fastest man ever over the 42.195 km distance.

Initially running in half marathons, he made his debut over the full distance in 2007 and won his first race later that year at the Amsterdam Marathon. He was fourth at both the 2008 and 2009 London Marathons, but managed to reach the podium at the 2009 World Championships, claiming the silver medal. His 2010 racing saw him finish as runner-up twice at the London and New York City Marathons. At the 2011 London Marathon he won on his fourth attempt with a course record and personal best time of 2:04:40.

En route to his second-place finish at the 2014 Berlin Marathon (2:03:13), Mutai set a world record at the 30K distance (1:27:37).

Career

Early life
Mutai grew up in Cheptigit, a village near Kaptagat, Uasin Gishu County in the Rift Valley Province, and his extended family includes Richard Limo, the 2001 World Champion over 5000 metres. Mutai began to make an impact domestically at the age of eighteen, taking third place over 10,000 metres at the Rift North Province Championships in 28:09.2 minutes.

It was on the roads of Europe that he began to make a name for himself, beginning with a win at the Nice Half Marathon in April 2006 and then a 10K best of 27:51 minutes for second place at the 10 km du Conseil Général 13 behind Edwin Soi (one of the fastest runs that year). He fared poorly on the track at the FBK Games the following month, but improved his half marathon best to 1:00:49 hours at the highly competitive Rotterdam Half Marathon, where he came sixth.

Marathon debut
Mutai was fifth at the Lisbon Half Marathon in March 2007, a race which preceded his debut over the marathon distance the following month. At the Rotterdam Marathon he completed the course in a time of 2:13:06 hours, placing seventh in a race affected by high temperatures. He defeated strong opposition in Robert Kipkoech Cheruiyot and world champion Jaouad Gharib at the Portugal Half Marathon in September, winning the Lisbon race with a quick finish. Mutai and Richard Limo did the front running at the Amsterdam Marathon the following month and the tactic paid off, as Mutai won his first marathon in a time of 2:06:29 hours – the second fastest mark that year after Haile Gebrselassie's world record run.

He began 2008 with a third-place finish at the 20 van Alphen race in the Netherlands. The London Marathon was his next destination and he improved his best time to 2:06:15 hours, although this was only enough for fourth in a fast race with three men under two hours and six minutes. Mutai's next outing was also in the United Kingdom and he broke the course record for the Great Scottish Run in Glasgow. His final run of 2008 was at the Chicago Marathon and he began strongly, pushing the race tempo to the point where he forced the pacemaker to prematurely drop out. However, he suffered in the latter stages of the race and ended up in sixth.

World Championship medal
Mutai again used the Lisbon Half Marathon as preparation for a spring Marathon in 2009 and he proved to be in good form, setting a personal best of 1:00:45 hours. At the 2009 London Marathon he posted his third sub-2:07 time, but again this left him in fourth place in the perennially fast race while Samuel Wanjiru broke the course record. He gained his first international selection that year as he was chosen for the marathon at the 2009 World Championships in Athletics. He remained among the leading pack and the race came down to a duel between Mutai and Abel Kirui in the latter stages. It was Kirui who took the lead to claim the title, but Mutai took the silver medal in a time of 2:07:48 hours, which was the second fastest ever run at the event. He set a half marathon best at the end of the year, running 1:00:39 for second place behind Silas Sang at the Portugal Half Marathon.

He ran on home turf at the beginning of 2010, coming third at the Discovery Half Marathon in Eldoret. He followed this with another personal best in Lisbon, approaching the hour mark with a time of 1:00:03 for third while Zersenay Tadese won in a world record time. At the 2010 London Marathon, Mutai could not keep pace with eventual winner Tsegaye Kebede, but he persevered nevertheless and made the podium for the first time, finishing in 2:06:23 for second place – his best ever placing at the race. The 2010 New York City Marathon was a closer affair, as Mutai and Gebre Gebremariam were neck-and-neck after 40 km, but Mutai was again relegated to second as his rival pulled away to win.

Breakthrough at 2011 London Marathon
Mutai won his first World Marathon Major event in April 2011, taking the title at the 2011 London Marathon with a course record and new personal best time of 2:04:40. This made him the fourth fastest runner ever over the distance. He was one of the favourites for the Great North Run, but it was half marathon specialist Martin Mathathi who took the honours and Mutai finished in third. His next major race was the 2011 New York City Marathon and his time of 2:06:28 hours was faster than the course record, although he was second place to Geoffrey Mutai. He attempted to defend his title at the 2012 London Marathon, but ended up in seventh some way off the winner Wilson Kipsang. Following the injury of Moses Mosop, he was drafted into the Kenyan Olympic marathon team as a replacement.

Achievements
All results regarding marathon and half marathon

References

External links

Marathoninfo profile

1984 births
Living people
Kenyan male long-distance runners
Kenyan male marathon runners
People from Rift Valley Province
London Marathon male winners
Olympic athletes of Kenya
Athletes (track and field) at the 2012 Summer Olympics
World Athletics Championships medalists